Tom Moxley (August 15, 1946) is an American politician who served as a member of the Kansas House of Representatives for the 68th district from 2007 to 2017.

Moxley is the owner of the Moxley Management Company and Moxley Ranch. He is the founder of the Kansas Livestock Association Ranch Land Trust and Tall Grass Legacy Alliance.

Moxley earned a Bachelor of Science degree in animal science from Kansas State University.

Committee membership
 Energy and Utilities
 Higher Education
 Agriculture and Natural Resources

References

External links
 Official Website
 Kansas Legislature - Tom Moxley
 Project Vote Smart profile
 Kansas Votes profile
 State Surge - Legislative and voting track record
 Campaign contributions: 2008

Republican Party members of the Kansas House of Representatives
People from Morris County, Kansas
Living people
21st-century American politicians
1946 births